Mother of Sorrows Catholic Church is a historic Catholic church at 1500 W. 6th Street in Ashtabula, Ohio, United States.  It was built in the 1890s for a newly established parish and has gained both local and federal designation as a historic site.

The Mass was first celebrated in Ashtabula Harbor in 1878, during the summer only in the early years; the first place of worship was a grocery store.  Out of this gathering, a parish was established in 1890 and dedicated to St. Mary under her title of "Mother of Sorrows".  Constructed in 1898 in the Romanesque Revival style of architecture, the church was designed by William P. Ginther, an Akron-based architect who specialized in ecclesiastical architecture.  Both the foundation and the walls are sandstone, the roof is asphalt, and glass forms a significant part of the exterior.  The church occupies a corner lot, and large gables with massive windows face both streets.  A square tower with battlements is placed at the corner facing the intersection; the main entrance is set in the tower's base, and a belfry occupies the top third of the tower.

In 1995, Mother of Sorrows was listed on the National Register of Historic Places, qualifying because of its historically significant architecture.  In 1978, the city of Ashtabula created the Harbor Historical District, which since a 2010 boundary adjustment has embraced Mother of Sorrows Church and much of the rest of the Ashtabula Harbor neighborhood.  Along with the other National Register properties in the district, Mother of Sorrows is protected by city ordinance from significant modifications.  Administratively, Mother of Sorrows is overseen by the city's Our Lady of Peace Parish. It no longer uses Mother of Sorrows properties such as its former rectory, school and some parking lots. In 2014, it applied to the city to change zoning on nine plots for potential redevelopment for retail and multi-family residential use. Some residents opposed rezoning, saying it would adversely affect work to stabilize the neighborhood. There was agreement to leave at least some parking to support community use of the church. In early 2017 Pastor of Our Lady of Peace Parish, Rev. Ray Thomas made the announcement that Bishop George Murry of the Diocese of Youngstown ordered the parish to close two of the three churches. Currently no churches have been named but many fear Mother of Sorrows and St. Joseph Churches will close. This would leave Our Lady of Mt. Carmel to serve the community of Ashtabula as the only Catholic Church.

References

External links
 Parish website

1890 establishments in Ohio
Religious organizations established in 1890
Roman Catholic churches completed in 1898
Ashtabula, Ohio
Buildings and structures in Ashtabula County, Ohio
Churches in the Roman Catholic Diocese of Youngstown
National Register of Historic Places in Ashtabula County, Ohio
Sandstone churches in the United States
19th-century Roman Catholic church buildings in the United States